Gopi Krishnan "Krish" is an Indian-origin technologist. He is the Chief Disruption Officer at GEMS Education.

Life and career 
Krish was born and raised in Ambasamudram in Tamil Nadu. He studied at St Xavier's College, Palayamkottai. He has an advanced diploma in Technology and Information Systems and a Postgraduate Diploma in International Business from the Indian Institute of Modern Management (IIMM). 

In 2006, Krish took up management roles in the First Gulf Bank. He later worked for BankMuscat International. In 2012, Krish joined Qatar Islamic Bank (QIB) as group Chief Information Officer (CIO). In 2016–2017, he was the Chief Information Officer/ Chief Digital Officer of the Al Hilal Bank in UAE. 

He is Chief Disruption Officer of the GEMS Education group.

Awards and recognition 
As reported in the February 2016 issue of the Computer News Middle East magazine, Krish was named as one of the best CIOs of the MENA (Middle East and North Africa) region for 2015, being the only CIO from Qatar’s banking industry to receive the honor. He was awarded the CIO of the year award at the MEFTECH Innovation Awards. The award was a recognition of his career with Qatar Islamic Bank, where he played a leadership role in taking a bank-wide transformation project live on its second attempt and bringing about core banking changes and legacy systems. He was also shortlisted for the Tech Leadership Award at the Banking Technology Awards for that year. Also that year, Krish received the CIO of the Year Award at the MEFTECH Innovation Awards held in Abu Dhabi, for his leadership roles, improvement and growth contributions as a senior executive in the innovations achieved by QIB as a MENA-based institution.

At the Enterprise Channels MEA-hosted Catalyst Award, 2017, Krish was one of the leaders recognized for his disruptive role in the region. He was also named "Chief Digital Officer (CDO) of the year across all GCC Nations" at the CDO Conclave Event in Dubai, UAE. Krish was awarded the title of Digital Disruptive Leader at DIGITRANS 2018 by Khaleej Times and MIT Sloane Management Review following his work with GEMS  "to challenge the status quo and to bring disruptive innovation in education and across the enterprise. He also won the "Digital Disruptor of the Year" at CDO Conclave 2018.

References 

Living people
Emirati businesspeople
Year of birth missing (living people)